Juraj Nikolac (born 22 April 1932) is a Croatian, formerly Yugoslav, chess player who received the FIDE title of Grandmaster (GM) in 1979. He previously held the International Master (IM) title since 1975. Nikolac was born in Metković and is a retired physics teacher. 

He finished 3= behind Aleksandar Matanović in the 1978 Yugoslav championship. His international tournament successes include:
 4th, Zagreb, 1973
 2=, Zagreb - Rovinj, 1975
 2=, Wijk aan Zee B, 1976
 1=, Amsterdam B, 1977
 1st, Vrnjacka Banja, 1978
 2nd, Dortmund, 1979
 2nd, Oberwart, 1985
 1st, Bled, 1986
 1=, Linz, 1986
 1st, Maribor, 1987

He is the author of a number of theoretical studies.

External links 
 
 
 

1932 births
Living people
Croatian chess players
Yugoslav chess players
Chess grandmasters
Sportspeople from Metković